Puerto Vallarta ( or simply Vallarta) is a Mexican beach resort city on the Pacific Ocean's Bahía de Banderas in the Mexican state of Jalisco. Puerto Vallarta is the second largest urban agglomeration in the state after the Guadalajara Metropolitan Area. The City of Puerto Vallarta is the government seat of the Municipality of Puerto Vallarta, which comprises the city as well as population centers outside of the city extending from Boca de Tomatlán to the Nayarit border (the Ameca River). To the north, it borders the southwest part of the state of Nayarit. To the east, it borders the municipality of Mascota and San Sebastián del Oeste, and to the south, it borders the municipalities of Talpa de Allende and Cabo Corrientes.

Puerto Vallarta is named after Ignacio Vallarta, a former governor of Jalisco. In Spanish, Puerto Vallarta is frequently shortened to "Vallarta", while English speakers call the city P.V. for short. In Internet shorthand, the city is often referred to as PVR, after the International Air Transport Association airport code for its Gustavo Diaz Ordaz International Airport.

History
Puerto Vallarta's proximity to the Bay of Banderas, the agricultural valley of the Ameca River, and the important mining centers in the Sierra have given the town a more interesting past than most Mexican tourist destinations. Puerto Vallarta was a thriving Mexican village long before it became an international tourist destination. Tourism is a major economic activity because of the climate, scenery, tropical beaches, and rich cultural history. The early village name for Puerto Villarta was Tintoque and the name Tintoque Puerto Villarta is still used formally to describe the city.

Playa Los Muertos (Beach of the Dead) 
In the 16th century, Hernán Cortés explored the Pacific side of Mexico by ship. Cortés used the established port of Acapulco to resupply and anchor his ships along the journey. During the early 1500s, he sent two of his ships North to explore the coastline without him. One of his ships wrecked in Banderas Bay and all but three men were reportedly killed by natives. It is believed the corpses of the lost sailors washed ashore. Native villagers encountered numerous corpses on the beach for days after the wreck.

Bay of Banderas (Bay of Flags) 
Pirates were known to attack ships along the Pacific Coast of Mexico as early as the 16th century. In the early 1500s the famous explorer Hernán Cortés set out to establish a safe harbor, north of Acapulco, to provide protection for cargo ships sailing the planned Manila galleon trade route to the Philippines. Just a thousand miles north, he discovered a large bay at the village of Tintoque. According to local legend, pirates were already anchoring in this bay and regularly pillaged local villagers while burying treasure in the hills. When Cortes and his crew set foot on the beach, a mob of angry villagers believed he and his crew were pirates and surrounded them with native weapons in hand. According to his journal, a Catholic friar accompanying the crew began praying to Lord for help. Villagers were mesmerized by the red flags the crew carried and suddenly lowered their weapons, allowing the explorers to pass peacefully. It's likely the villagers had seen the flags before when they floated ashore with the dead crew from a Cortés ship that wrecked earlier in the bay. This is how the Bay of Bandarous was named. Francisco Cortés de Buenaventura, the nephew of Hernán Cortés, is said to have formalized the bay's name during his own conquering of the region in 1525. In the following years, Tintoque became a major port and safe harbor for ships traveling the Manila galleon.

Pre-Hispanic times to the 19th century

Few details are known about the history of the area prior to the 19th century. The limited evidence in occidental Mexican archeology have limited the current knowledge about pre-historic life in the area.

Spanish missionary and conquistador documents chronicle skirmishes between the Spanish colonizers and the local peoples. In 1524, for example, a large battle between Hernán Cortés and an army of 10,000 to 20,000 indigenous warriors resulted in Cortés taking control of much of the Ameca valley. The valley was then named Banderas (flags) after the colorful standards carried by the natives.

Also the area appears on maps and in sailing logs as a bay of refuge for the Manila Galleon trade as well as for other coastal seafarers. As such it figures in some accounts of pirate operations and smuggling and pirate contravention efforts by the viceregal government. During the 17th and 18th centuries the Banderas Valley and its beaches along the Bay of Banderas served as supply points for ships seeking refuge in the bay. The area also served as a point where smuggled goods could be sent on to the Sierra towns near Mascota, evading the customs operations at San Blas, Nayarit.

El Carrizal and Las Peñas - 19th century

During the 19th century the history of Puerto Vallarta, then called El Carrizal or Las Peñas, was linked to the history of the Sierra towns of San Sebastián del Oeste, Talpa de Allende and Mascota. While today these towns are considered quaint tourist destinations, during much of the 18th century, Mascota was Jalisco's second largest town, after Guadalajara. Mascota and its neighboring towns located in the high plateaus of the Sierra, developed as agricultural towns to support the growing mining operations in the Sierra.

During the 18th century, as Mascota grew, Puerto Vallarta grew with it, transforming itself from a small fishing and pearl-diving village into a small beach-landing port serving the Sierra towns. At the time the main port serving Jalisco was located at San Blas, but the inconvenient overland route from San Blas to the Sierra towns made Puerto Vallarta a more convenient alternative for smaller shipments, not to mention smuggling operations which evaded the tax collectors at San Blas. Puerto Vallarta also became a vacation destination for residents of the Sierra Towns, and by the mid 19th century, the town already had its regularly returning population of vacationers. Most of the early settlers in Puerto Vallarta were families who had left the Sierra towns for one reason or another.

1859 saw an important turning point for the small village, then known as Las Peñas. That year the Union en Cuale mining company took possession of land extending from Los Arcos to the Pitillal river and extending back up into the Sierra for kilometres. The Union en Cuale company was owned in part by the Camarena brothers of Guadalajara who had developed a small trade in palm oil in Las Peñas. The purpose of the government's sale of the land to the company was to provide for shipping, fishing and agricultural support for the mining operations which were growing quite quickly in the Sierra.

The official founding story of Las Peñas and thus of Puerto Vallarta is that it was founded by Guadalupe Sánchez Torres, his wife Ambrosia Carrillo and some friends such as Cenobio Joya, Apolonio de Robles, Cleofas Peña and Martín Andrade, among others, on December 12, 1851, and was given the name of Las Peñas de Santa María de Guadalupe since it was the day dedicated to the virgin of Guadalupe.  Although the purchase record of the property by  Guadalupe Sanchez is dated 1859, his family lived there prior to the purchase year. Also even as early as 1850 the area was already peopled by fishermen, pearl divers, smugglers and foragers, all of whom had something of a permanent existence in the area. Given the existing historical documents it is simply impossible to date the first permanent settlement in the area,

There is however no doubt the development of Las Peñas into a self-sustaining village of any significant size happened in the 1860s as the mouth of the Cuale area was exploited to support the operations of the newly enfranchised Union en Cuale company. As such 1859 marks the beginning of Puerto Vallarta as a village. Twenty years later, by 1885, the village comprised about 250 homes and about 800 residents.

The early municipality - early 20th century

In 1918, the village was elevated to municipality status and renamed after former state governor Ignacio Vallarta. During the early years of the 20th century, most of Puerto Vallarta was owned by the Union en Cuale company controlled by the American Alfred Geist. Geist sold land only in large plots at prices that were quite high for the time and otherwise leased the land on short-term leases. To remedy this situation and to enable the new municipality to develop, the citizens petitioned the government for a land grant based on the new constitution's provisions.

The grant was established as an ejido holding (a farming cooperative administered by the government). Legal squabbling over the size of the land grant, and the ejido status of the properties involved would stymie growth in Puerto Vallarta into the 1960s, as developers were reluctant to build anything too substantial on land for which one could not obtain clear title. (Ejido land is controlled by individuals who are given licenses to use it, but it could not be sold, subdivided or leased.)

During the Cristero War, the municipality was twice taken over by Cristero forces (April 1927 and January 1928). After it was recaptured for a second time, the national government stationed a small garrison there under Major Ángel Ocampo. The garrison was stationed near the mouth of the Cuale River and is responsible for planting many of the palms that now line the beaches near the mouth of the Cuale River to help limit beach erosion during heavy rains in October 1928. One casualty of the skirmishes was local pastor Padre Ayala who was exiled to Guadalajara for his role in fomenting the local revolt. He died there in 1943, though his remains were returned 10 years later and interred in the main parish church of Our Lady of Guadalupe.

As mining activities in the Sierra waned in the early years of the 20th century, Puerto Vallarta and the agricultural valley to the north of the city became important destinations for those leaving the Sierra towns and looking for a place to settle. Many of those who arrived had family members already living in Puerto Vallarta, and the pattern of migration that ensued turned the town into a collection of more or less extended families, giving it the cohesion of a typical sierra town.

From 1925 until 1935, the Montgomery Fruit Company operated in the area around Ixtapa. Friction with the state government over labor issues eventually led to the venture being abandoned, but for ten years it provided an important source of employment in the area.

The first airplane service arrived in 1932, with electrical service on a small scale arriving about the same time. The first suspension bridge over the Cuale went up in 1933. The city's first plumbing system was started in 1939.In 1942, Puerto Vallarta was finally connected by road to Compostela, Nay. Until then the only access to Puerto Vallarta was by sea, air, or by mule trails to the sierra towns. Also in 1942, in the New York-based magazine Modern Mexico the first advertisement for a Puerto Vallarta vacation appeared, sponsored by the Air Transport Company of Jalisco. By 1945, the company was landing DC-3s in Puerto Vallarta (carrying 21 passengers).

By the 1950s, Puerto Vallarta had started to attract Americans, mostly writers and artists in search of a retreat from the USA of the era of Eisenhower and McCarthy. Gringo Gulch began to develop as an expatriate neighborhood on the hill above the Centro. The city also attracted Mexican artists and writers who were willing to trade the comforts of life in the larger cities for its scenic and bucolic advantages.

In 1956, the Mascota mule trail was replaced by a packed dirt road. In 1958, 24-hour electrical generation arrived. A new airport arrived in 1962 connecting Puerto Vallarta with Los Angeles via Mazatlán, and the Mexican Aviation Company began offering package trips.

By the early 1960s, the population had started to spread beyond the Centro and Gringo Gulch, and the Colonias of 5 de Diciembre (north of the Centro) and Emiliano Zapata (south of the Cuale River) began to grow.

The modern resort - 1960s to the present

Six influences in the 1960s and 1970s launched Puerto Vallarta into becoming a major resort destination.

First: The Mexican federal government resolved century-old property disputes of land that had communal status, land the federal government had appropriated from the Union en Cuale mining company to be parceled out as communal farms. The land's communal (ejido) status had stifled development in the town for much of the 20th century. A significant transition of communal lands into private ownership within present Puerto Vallarta city limits took place in 1973 with the establishment of the Vallarta Land Trust (Fideicomiso) to oversee selling government land into private hands, and using the sales revenue to develop the city's infrastructure.

Second: American director John Huston filmed his 1964 movie The Night of the Iguana in Mismaloya, a small town just south of Puerto Vallarta. During the filming, the US media gave extensive coverage to Elizabeth Taylor's extramarital affair with Richard Burton, as well as the frequent fighting between Huston and the film's four stars. The publicity helped put Puerto Vallarta on the map for US tourists.

Third: The Mexican government invested significantly in transportation improvements, making Puerto Vallarta an easy travel destination. To make Puerto Vallarta accessible by jet aircraft the government developed the city's international airport. Ground transportation significantly improved. Government invested heavily in the development of highway and utility infrastructure. Another vital improvement for the city was the El Salado wharf (where the current cruise terminal is), inaugurated on June 1, 1970, making Puerto Vallarta Jalisco's first harbor town. Improvements and investment in infrastructure led to Puerto Vallarta experiencing tourist booms, starting in the late 1960s. While tourists from the U.S. and Canada started flowing in, tourists in Puerto Vallarta were principally from Mexico, who started traveling to Puerto Vallarta because the improved infrastructure (4-lane paved highways) made travel easy and convenient (e.g., Guadalajara and Puerto Vallarta).

Fourth: In 1968 the Puerto Vallarta municipality was elevated to City status. The elevation in status reflected interest by Mexican federal and state governments in developing the Puerto Vallarta as an international resort destination. Puerto Vallarta has since also attracted a lively immigrant community from the U.S., Canada and Europe.

Fifth: The City showcased its new image. In August 1970, U.S. President Richard Nixon met with Mexican then-President Gustavo Díaz Ordaz in Puerto Vallarta for treaty negotiations. The visit showcased Puerto Vallarta's recently developed international airport and resort infrastructure. The U.S. presidential visit contributed significantly to getting Puerto Vallarta's name in the news and visibility as a resort destination.

Sixth: Resort hotel development in Puerto Vallarta boomed in the 1970s. Prior to 1973 hotels in Puerto Vallarta tended to be modest, mid-priced establishments. Only two large sized luxury hotels existed (the Real and the Posada Vallarta). After 1973, Puerto Vallarta experienced rapid growth in global-brand luxury hotels and international resorts, to where in 2013 there are approximately 41 five star and four star rated hotels.

An economic downturn in Mexico caused tourists to flock to Puerto Vallarta. In 1982, the peso was devalued and Puerto Vallarta became a bargain destination for US tourists. Consequently, the mid-1980s saw a marked and rapid rise in the tourist volume. This uptick fueled additional development, for example the Marina which was started in 1986. But Puerto Vallarta's success caused other Mexican cities to take note. The early 1990s saw Mexico's government and private business develop other resort destinations, such as Ixtapa and Cancún. This took away Puerto Vallarta's exclusivity of sorts on the foreign tourist trade, and caused a slump in travel to Puerto Vallarta.

With growth comes problems. During the early 1980s, Puerto Vallarta experienced a marked increase in problems related to poverty. While the devaluation of the peso brought record numbers of tourists to the area, it also stifled investment and thus construction. While more and more workers were arriving in Puerto Vallarta to try to cash in on the booming tourist trade, less and less was being done to accommodate them with housing and related infrastructure.

During the mid-1980s, Puerto Vallarta experienced a rapid expansion of impromptu communities poorly served by even basic public services. This very low standard of living leveled out Puerto Vallarta's resort boom. In the late 1980s Puerto Vallarta's government worked to alleviate the situation by developing housing and infrastructure. But the legacy of the 1980s boom remains, as the outlying areas of Puerto Vallarta suffer from poor provision of basic services (i.e. water, sewage, roads).

In 1993, the federal Agrarian Law was amended allowing for more secure foreign tenure of former ejido land. Those controlling ejido land were allowed to petition for regularization, a process that converted their controlling interest into fee simple ownership. This meant that the property could be sold, and it led to a boom in the development of private residences, mostly condominiums, and a new phase of Puerto Vallarta's expansion began, centered more on accommodating retirees, snowbirds, and those who visited the city enough to make purchasing a condominium or a time-share a cost-effective option.

Climate
Puerto Vallarta has a Tropical wet and dry climate (Köppen climate classification Aw), with dry winters and rainy summers. The rainy season extends from mid June through mid October, with most of the rain between July and September. August is the city's wettest month, with an average of 14 days with significant precipitation. Even during the rainy season precipitation tends to be concentrated in large rainstorms. Occasional tropical storms will bring thunderstorms to the city in November, though the month is typically dry. There is a marked dry season in the winter. February, March and April are the months with the least cloud cover.
 
Prevailing winds are from the southwest, and most weather systems approaching Puerto Vallarta are consequently weakened as they pass over Cabo Corrientes. Thus even during the rainy season Puerto Vallarta's weather tends to be mild compared to other areas along the Mexican Pacific coast.

Hurricanes seldom strike Puerto Vallarta. In 1971, Hurricane Lily, a category 1 hurricane, caused serious flooding on the Isla Cuale, prompting the city to relocate all of its residents to the new Colonia Palo Seco.

Hurricane Patricia
Hurricane Patricia, a Category 5 storm, became the most powerful cyclone ever measured in the Western Hemisphere with sustained wind speeds up to  200 mph (320 km/h). Hurricane Patricia was forecast to make landfall at Puerto Vallarta on the evening of October 23, 2015, with catastrophic damage predicted for the town and surrounding areas and the potential for mud slides. The storm changed from a Category 1 to a Category 5 in just 24 hours, thus catching some vacationers off guard and leaving many trapped in the town. The Jalisco state government put together 30 buses to evacuate tourists from the coast to Guadalajara, a 5-hour ride inland. Manzanillo, Colima was also near the forecast catastrophic damage zone. Ultimately, Patricia made landfall south of Puerto Vallarta, sparing the city from any significant damage.

Geography, geology and ecology

Geographical characteristics

Puerto Vallarta lies on a narrow coastal plain at the foot of the Sierras Cuale and San Sebastián, parts of the Sierra Madre Occidental. The plain widens to the north, reaching its widest point along the Ameca river. Three rivers flow from the Sierra through the area. From south to north they are the Cuale, the Pitillal, and the Ameca. A number of arroyos also run from the Sierra to the coastal plain. Many of the valleys of these rivers and arroyos are inhabited. Also development has to some extent spread up the hillsides from the coastal plain.

The city proper comprises four main areas: the hotel zone along the shore to the north, Olas Altas - Colonia Emiliano Zapata to the south of the Cuale river (recently named Zona Romántica in some tourist brochures), the Centro along the shore between these two areas, and a number of residential areas to the east of the hotel zone. The oldest section of the town is the area of Col. Centro near the church of Our Lady of Guadalupe, especially Hidalgo street.

Seismic history
Puerto Vallarta, like much of the west coast of North America, is prone to earthquakes, though Puerto Vallarta tends to experience only peripheral effects of earthquakes centered further south. On 9 October 1995, an earthquake located off the Colima coast shook the crown from the top of the Roman Catholic Church.

Economy
Nearly 50% of the workforce is employed in tourist related industries: hotels, restaurants, personal services, and transportation. The municipality does, however, continue to have strong agricultural, industrial and commercial sectors.

Tourism trends
Puerto Vallarta was once named as La ciudad más amigable del mundo (The Friendliest City in the World), as the sign reads when entering from Nayarit. Today, numerous sidewalk touts selling time-shares and tequila render the city's atmosphere more akin to tourist-heavy resorts like Cancun and Acapulco, but overall the city's reputation remains relatively undiminished.

Tourism in Puerto Vallarta has increased steadily over the years and makes up 50% of the city's economic activity. The high season for international tourism in Puerto Vallarta is from late November through March (or later, depending on the timing of the college spring break period in the U.S.) The city is especially popular with U.S. residents from the southern and western U.S. because of the number of direct flights between Puerto Vallarta and Atlanta, Los Angeles, San Francisco, Seattle, Denver, Phoenix, Dallas, Houston, Minneapolis, and Chicago. It is also popular with tourists from western Canada with a number of direct scheduled and charter flights from western Canadian cities.

Puerto Vallarta is also a highly popular vacation spot for domestic tourists. It is a popular weekend destination for residents of Guadalajara (tapatíos), and a popular national destination for vacations such as Semana Santa (the week preceding Easter) and Christmas. As Acapulco has experienced a rise in drug-related violence, Puerto Vallarta has absorbed much of the Mexico City resort vacation business (Acapulco has long been a common destination for tourists from Mexico City).

Rapid growth in tourist volume in Puerto Vallarta has given rise to rapid growth in hotel and rental apartment construction. This growth has spilled over from the city limits into Nuevo Vallarta in the neighboring state of Nayarit.

Real estate tourism 
Puerto Vallarta has become a popular retirement destination for U.S. and Canadian retirees. This has created a number of neighborhoods within the Puerto Vallarta region that cater primarily to real estate tourism, such as the Hotel Zone, which stretches from downtown Vallarta to the airport and Marina Vallarta (near the airport), and Amapas and Conchas Chinas, which are built into the mountain slightly south and behind Puerto Vallarta, and overlook the city and bay. Most recently the downtown area, especially in Emiliano Zapata (also known as the Romantic Zone), has seen a somewhat controversial trend of traditional homes being razed for the construction of condominium buildings. This region in recent years has been the most popular for Vallarta real estate tourism, with nearly 25% of all real estate sales for the region taking place there in 2019. Controversial construction of condominium towers has also been taking place along the coastline heading south in Conchas Chinas and along the South Shore.

The Vallarta tourism real estate tourism market is made up of both full-time retirees and a second-home owners, primarily from the United States. On average about 40% of buyers are American, with nationals consisting of 30% and Canadians and other foreign buyers making up the remaining 20%. Mexicans favor destinations such as Puerto Vallarta, Los Cabos and Cancun not just for the sun and beach, but also as real estate investment to hedge their pesos as real estate in these regions is priced in USD, rather than in pesos like the rest of the country.

Puerto Vallarta can be classified as a medium-ranged real estate market with a market consisting mostly of condominiums with the average price around US$320,000 in 2019. Higher-end real estate can be found primarily in Conchas Chinas, however Punta Mita, at the northern point of Banderas Bay in the neighboring state of Nayarit, has becoming increasingly more popular with wealthier buyers over the past ten years.

Any foreigner wishing to buy real estate in Puerto Vallarta (or anywhere along the coast of Mexico), can't own real estate here outright, but needs to establish a fideicommissum or beneficial trust which is held with a Mexican Bank on the owner's behalf. It isn't the same as holding the title, but it has worked well and with few problems for more than 50 years. The trust is good for 50 years and can be renewed for another 50-year period.

LGBT tourism

Guadalajara and Acapulco were common vacation destinations for gay men and lesbians from Mexico City and, especially, the United States and Canada in the 1980s and 1990s. But since that time, Puerto Vallarta has developed into Mexico's premier resort town as a sort of satellite gay space for its big sister Guadalajara, much as Fire Island is to New York City and Palm Springs is to Los Angeles. It is now considered the most welcoming and gay-friendly destination in the country, dubbed the "San Francisco of Mexico." Previously quite conservative, the municipal government has become increasingly supportive in recognising and accepting the LGBT tourism segment and supporting LGBT events such as Vallarta gay pride celebrations, which launched in 2013 and are now held annually to coincide with U.S. Memorial Day weekend. It boasts a gay scene, centered in the city's south-side Zona Romántica, of hotels and resorts as well as many bars, nightclubs and a gay beach on the main shore. Puerto Vallarta has been cited as the number one gay beach destination in Latin America, with city officials claiming a 5% tourism increase in 2013.

Population and growth rate for Puerto Vallarta
The major suburb is Bahia de Banderas in Nayarit across state lines, in which Nuevo Vallarta and Sayulita are localities.  Ixtapa is a locality in PV, not to be confused with the municipality of Ixtapa in Guerrero state.
 

sources: (locality & 2015 municipal)  (municipal to 2010) sources: Cuaderno Estadistico Municipal Censo de Poblacion y Vivienda 2010

Growth-related problems

Water pollution

Visibility in the water off Puerto Vallarta, close to the mouths of the rivers is poor in the summer, but away from these locations visibility in the summer is greater than in the dry season. In Puerto Vallarta, the sewage is treated by a British/Dutch company with a "State of the Art" facility. Outside of the City there may be no connection to this and in the rainy season some pollution can happen around the river mouths, but it quickly dissipates in the bay, which is a huge body of water.

Poverty
Poverty remains a problem in Puerto Vallarta, fueled by the constant influx of persons seeking employment. Many areas of the city are still poorly served by roads and sewers. For example, Colonia Ramblases is served by roads in generally poor condition only 10% of which are paved, and Ramblases has been a populated neighborhood since the 1940s.

The Municipality of Puerto Vallarta comprises about 45,000 regular dwellings. Of those, 10% do not have a potable water supply (carrying their water from a public tap), 8% do not have connections to a sewer system or septic system (using instead crude septic pits or dumping sewage directly into waterways), and 4% do not have electricity.  One reason for this is the difficulty the city has enforcing building regulations.

Many of the jobs available in Puerto Vallarta are classed as inferior by the Secretariat for Social Development, and even jobs that are generally well paying tend to be seasonal, so for example, waiters depend heavily on tips to supplement incomes that can be as low as 80 pesos a day - the applicable minimum wage in Jalisco.
 

There have recently (2005 to 2007) been improvements like the new IMSS facilities in Col. Versalles, improvements to several recreation facilities, improved communal beach access policies, etc. Still efforts seem to aim more at quick and visible infrastructure improvements than at solving the more pressing and enduring problem of insufficient infrastructure for basic services.

One positive result of recent growth has been that in relative terms a smaller percentage of the population lives in older and poorly served neighborhoods. A growing number of residents live in housing projects and low income housing developments which provide at least adequate basic services. So perhaps having stemmed the growth of the problem with the new developments, the city will eventually be able to devote its resources to improving existing neighborhoods.

Transportation

Airport 

The Licenciado Gustavo Díaz Ordaz International Airport comprises a commercial international section and a general aviation section. The airfield is capable of handling 40 takeoffs or landings per hour. The airport terminal has 16 active gates, with an additional six under construction in a terminal extension project as of August 2011.

The general aviation section handles small planes leaving for San Sebastián del Oeste, Mascota, and other towns in the Sierra and along the Coast. It has 18 loading positions and shares the commercial airfield.

Cruise ships

The port of Puerto Vallarta receives cruise ships on a regular basis during the tourist season.  The docks (Muelle de Cruceros Puerto Vallarta) can berth three cruise ships simultaneously.  Trips to the El Centro old town and its beach front and tourist markets, including some art stores, are available.  The beach front has been recently undergoing additional improvements to the Malecon, a long promenade along the beach with numerous sculptures, restaurants, night clubs, access to boat-pulled paragliding over the bay, and various other tourist specific activities and markets.

Bus station and regional buses
National bus lines connect Puerto Vallarta (via the Central Camionera near the Modelo building north of town near the airport) with Guadalajara, Mazatlán, Manzanillo and points beyond. Bus lines include ETN and Primera Plus. Smaller bus lines connect Puerto Vallarta to small coastal and sierra towns.

Rail
Puerto Vallarta currently has no passenger rail service. Historically, buses connected with nearby Tepic, where there was a passenger rail service on the main north–south trunk of Ferromex. Heading north, trains continued to Nogales, opposite its namesake in Arizona. A spur headed northwest to Mexicali, opposite Calexico, California. Service to the east went to Guadalajara and then to Mexico City.

Local transportation

Puerto Vallarta is serviced by three municipal bus unions that provide coverage for most of the greater Puerto Vallarta area (e.g. Ixtapa, Mismaloya, Pitillal). Most of the population of the Municipality of Puerto Vallarta travels by municipal bus. Automobile ownership is not rare, but cars are seldom used to commute to and from work. They are typically reserved for family outings and major shopping trips.

As of June 2017, Uber began operating in Puerto Vallarta. Their arrival has not been without conflict, as there have been confrontations between them due to their much lower rates.

Government

Education 

Puerto Vallarta has schools for all levels from kindergarten to university education both private and public.

Puerto Vallarta has a campus from one of the best known universities in Mexico, the University of Guadalajara. But it also has many other lesser known public and private university options such as the UNIVA university and the Instituto Tecnologico de Puerto Vallarta (Puerto Vallarta Technological Institute). Some of these universities also offer high school level education.

Culture: arts and cuisine

Local food specialties
Huachinango zarandeado - red snapper marinated in a birria paste (roast peppers, garlic and spices) and grilled.
Grilled Mahi-mahi - served on the beaches and at some taco stands - the meat is skewered and cooked over coals then served with hot sauce and lime.
Ceviche - raw fish, scallops, or shrimp, with onions, chiles such as serranos or jalapeños, and lime or lemon juice. The lime juice cures the fish, turning the flesh opaque and giving it a chewy texture. The ceviche is usually served with tortilla chips or on a whole tostada, and quite frequently accompanied by guacamole.

Film and television

The Night of the Iguana (1963) was filmed on location at Mismaloya and other minor locations in the Puerto Vallarta area. The filming brought Richard Burton, Ava Gardner, Deborah Kerr, Tennessee Williams, and Elizabeth Taylor (who was not in the film). The off-screen activities of Burton and Taylor were reported in the tabloids and tabloid newsreels of the day. After filming was completed, Elizabeth Taylor and Richard Burton bought a house in Puerto Vallarta and visited the city regularly while they were married. John Huston decided to build a home in the vicinity, a home on remote Las Caletas beach and a house in town. John Huston's children Anjelica Huston and Danny Huston are founders and supporters of the Puerto Vallarta Film Festival. (In the film, children are shown selling iguana meat by the roadside. The iguana was once an important food animal, popular in Jalisco and Colima.)
Swashbuckler (1976) a pirate movie Robert Shaw stars in, has a prominent swimming scene filmed at Los Arcos.
Herbie Goes Bananas (1980) is the fourth of a series of films made by Walt Disney Productions starring Herbie, a white, anthropomorphic 1963 Volkswagen Beetle race car. The film stars Cloris Leachman and Harvey Korman.
Predator (1987) features jungle scenes which were filmed in the hills behind Mismaloya. The film starred Arnold Schwarzenegger and was directed by John McTiernan. McTiernan lost quite a bit of weight during the filming because he was afraid to eat the local food. The cast also endured dangerous obstacles in the jungles such as changing weather, cold water and wildlife.
Perfect Target (1997) action film starring Daniel Bernhardt is filmed also in the city.
Puerto Vallarta Squeeze (2004), a filmed version of the Robert James Waller's novel of the same name, was shot on location in and around Puerto Vallarta. It stars Scott Glenn and Harvey Keitel.
Limitless (2011) features a car scene driving through downtown Malecon.
Puerto Vallarta is The Love Boats (1977-1986) final port of call.
Beverly Hills Chihuahua (2008) has some scenes filmed in Vallarta.
Drake and Josh (2003-2007) has an episode where Josh Nichols (Josh Peck) says "Congratulations you've won an all expenses paid trip to Puerto Vallarta!"
 The low-budget monster flicks Dinoshark and Sharktopus have their respective creatures primarily attacking in Puerto Vallarta.

Landmarks, sights, activities

Landmarks in Puerto Vallarta

Church of Our Lady of Guadalupe - Colonia Centro
Púlpito and Pilitas (Pulpit and Baptismal Font) - Colonia Emiliano Zapata - two rock formations at the South end of Los Muertos Beach.  El Púlpito is the tall headland and Las Pilitas are the formation of rocks beneath it.  Las Pilitas was the original location of the Boy on a Seahorse sculpture (El Caballito) now located on the Malecón, an identical sculpture is also located on Los Muertos Beach. There are two streets in the Olas Altas area named after the rock formations.
Playa Conchas Chinas (Curly Shells Beach) - Fraccionamiento Amapas - the city's most secluded beach, located to the south of the headland which forms the boundary of Los Muertos beach.
The Malecón - paved walkway along the seashore in Colonia Centro - especially popular during the Sunday evening paseo. It features a collection of contemporary sculptures by Sergio Bustamante, Alejandro Colunga, Ramiz Barquet and others. The Malecon was extensively rebuilt in 2002-2003 following damage from hurricane Kenna. It was also greatly renovated, having new walkways and iconic sculptures in 2010
Mercado Isle Cuale and Mercado Municipal Río Cuale - there are two large public markets in the Centro (Downtown) along the banks of the Cuale selling a variety of artisanal and souvenir goods, and the Isla Cuale has a number of souvenir vendor shops as well. The Isla Cuale was also famous for its cat population. The Island was a lower class suburb until flooding during Hurricane Lily (1971) forced residents to be relocated. They were moved to Palo Seco (which means "dry stick") and the Island was converted into a site for restaurants, shops and a cultural center.
Cuale Archaeological Museum - on the West side of the Isla Cuale, the museum presents a significant collection of local and regional pre-Hispanic art in a number of informative displays. The museum also houses a small gallery for showing contemporary art.
Statue of John Huston on Isla Cuale - dedicated on the 25th anniversary of the film's release and honoring Huston's contributions to the city. John's son Danny was married in a ceremony that took place at the statue in 2002.
Plaza de Armas (Ignacio Vallarta) / Aquiles Serdán Amphitheater (Los Arcos) - the city's main plaza - site of public concerts both at the bandstand in the Plaza de Armas and on the stage in front of the arches across the street.
City Hall - a modern city hall laid out using a traditional courtyard plan. There is a tourist office in the SW corner, and on the landing of the main (West off the courtyard) stairwell there is a modest naive style mural by local artist Manuel Lepe.
Saucedo Theatre Building (Juárez and Iturbide) - Built in 1922 in a Belle Époque style reminiscent of architecture of the Porfirato. The theater presented live shows and films on its first floor, and the second floor housed a ballroom. The building has been converted to retail use.

Landmarks south of Puerto Vallarta
Los Arcos Marine Natural Area - offshore of Mismaloya 12 km south of Puerto Vallarta. The area has been a National Marine Park since 1984. The area is protected as a breeding ground for pelicans, boobies and other sea birds. The park is a popular snorkeling destination both for the rocks themselves and for the fossilized coral beds that surround them.
Vallarta Botanical Gardens - A popular showcase of orchids, agaves, cactus, palms, and other native plants. A restaurant and river swimming is also available to visitors. The gardens are located  South of Puerto Vallarta on Highway 200. Buses for the Vallarta Botanical Gardens depart from the corner of Carranzas and Aguacate Streets in the Zona Romantica and are labeled as both "El Tuito" and "Botanical Gardens".
Puerto Vallarta Zoo - with 350 animals, and located in a forested setting in Mismaloya.

Landmarks north of Puerto Vallarta

University of Guadalajara's Coastal Center - North of Pitillal and West of Ixtapa, the campus features several public attractions including the Peter Gray Art Museum and a Crocodile Farm.
Ixtapa Archaeological Zone - north of the town of Ixtapa along the banks of the Ameca River there is an archeological site with remains going back several thousand years. The site comprises 29 mounds. The largest measures 40 meters in diameter and 8 meters in height. The site also includes the remains of ceremonial ball court. The original inhabitants of the site were vassals of the Aztatlán kingdom which was located in Western Jalisco between 900 and 1200 AD. The site is the oldest explored in Western Jalisco. The digs have uncovered a number of residential and ceremonial sites, a wealth of pottery (incense burners, bowls, amphora, etc.). Many of these objects are on display at the Rio Cuale Island Museum.

Landmarks east of Puerto Vallarta
Terra Noble Art and Healing Center - a New Age spa, meditation center and artist retreat on the hills east of Puerto Vallarta along the edge of the Agua Azul Nature Reserve overlooking Bahía de Banderas. The complex, built to resemble an early Mexican wattle and daub home was created by architect Jorge Rubio in conjunction with American sculptor Suzy Odom.Listing for Terra Noble at Moon Travel Guides 

Beaches and beach towns

Beaches in Puerto Vallarta
Playa Camarones (Shrimp Beach) - Colonia 5 de Diciembre (vicinity of Av. Paragua - Hotel Buenaventura. This is the northernmost public beach in the City of Puerto Vallarta proper. It is named after the shrimp fishermen that once landed their launches on the beach to unload their catch.
Playa Olas Altas (High Waves Beach) - Colonia Emiliano Zapata - the beach extends from the Cuale River South to the fishing pier. In spite of the name, the waves offshore are not particularly high, and the beach is a popular place to swim, especially for locals and national tourists. The beach is lined with outdoor restaurants.  
Playa de los Muertos (Beach of the Dead) - Colonia Emiliano Zapata - the city's largest public beach. Legend has it the beach's name (Dead Men's Beach) stems from a battle between pirates and local miners after which bodies remained strewn on the beach, but it's a legend, since there were never any miners in Vallarta. The South Side of the beach is a popular gathering spot for gay and lesbian tourists. The North end is frequented mostly by locals, and national tourists. The city has recently tried to change the name of the beach to Playa del Sol.
Boca de Tomates (Mouth of Tomatoes) - a beach located near the mouth of the Ameca River. The beach is not very popular among international tourists due to the rocks that come ashore especially in the summertime. Also watch out for crocodiles. Its proximity to the Ameca River which carries muddy rainwater in the summertime causes the water to lose its clarity making it appear dirty.

Beaches south of Puerto Vallarta
Playa Mismaloya – at the mouth of the Mismaloya River. The beach was featured in several scenes from Night of the Iguana and the main set was located on hillside to the south of the beach. The beach is developed with a number of restaurants.South Shores beaches'''
A number of beaches along the South shore of the bay are accessible only by boat from mismaloya beach. The developed beaches include (east to west): Las Animas, Quimixto, Majahuitas and Yelapa. These and other smaller undeveloped beaches can be reached by launch from Boca de Tomatlán.
Playa Las Animas - a narrow wide white sand beach developed with several restaurants.
Playa Las Caletas - a secluded beach that was once the private retreat of film director John Huston. Today it is a wildlife preserve. There is a living natural reef close to shore which makes the beach a popular destination for snorkelers.
Playa Quimixto - a somewhat rocky and secluded beach which is settled by a small village of several hundred families. There are horse and guide hire concessions in the town which lead visitors through a small canyon behind the town to a series of waterfalls.
Yelapa - once a small electricity free fishing village and a popular "hideaway" for gringos, now it has electricity, telephones and the internet. Visited by tourist boats for about 3 hours a day, it reverts to its laid back ways when they leave.

Beaches north of Puerto Vallarta
The north shore of the bay is lined with beach towns that offer good wading beaches and the usual tourist amenities. These include (east to west): Bucerias, Cruz de Huanacaxtle, Playa la Manzanilla, Playa Destiladeras, Playa Pontoque, and Punta Mita, all in the State of Nayarit. All can be reached by bus (departing from Wal-Mart).

Local festivals
Beef Dip Bear Week - An annual gay event for bears and their admirers at end of January and beginning of February. 
Flower and Garden Festival (last week of February) - A week of tours, classes, and workshops at the Vallarta Botanical Gardens. Dozens of plant, garden, flower, and local craft vendors feature their products and knowledge.
Electro Beach Puerto Vallarta (42-day festival starting in the beginning of March) - An Electronic Dance Music (EDM) festival.
May Festival (last week of May and first week of June) - commemorating the anniversary of the municipality. The festival features outdoor concerts, artistic expositions, sporting events and a parade.
Día de Muertos - Day of the Dead (November 2) - A day of honoring the dead in full Mexican Tradition held at the Vallarta Botanical Gardens. Workshops on making catrina skeleton dolls and cempasúchil (Tagetes erecta) flower arrangements are followed by celebrations in the Garden of Memories and a bonfire dance.
Las Posadas (20 December) - An evening of candlelight caroling & processions to handmade nativities is hosted by the Vallarta Botanical Gardens. Poinsettias and native Mexican pines are also featured during the celebrations.
1 to 12 December - Festival of the Virgin of Guadalupe

Neighborhoods
Puerto Vallarta comprises numerous neighborhoods (colonias). Notable neighborhoods include (from South to North)
Res. Conchas Chinas - hillside Southeast from Los Muertos beach.
Col. Alta Vista.
Amapas - on the hillside behind Los Muertos beach overlooking the bay.
Col. Emiliano Zapata - South of the Cuale (called Zona Romántica or "Old Town" in tourist brochures)
Cols. Caloso and Canoas - east of Col. Emiliano Zapata and up the Rio Cuale.
Col. Centro - the oldest section of town and its current center - North of the Cuale river to Parque Hidalgo.
Col. 5 Diciembre - just north of the Centro, and with Col. Zapata among the first neighborhoods beyond the Centro to be developed.
Col. Lázaro Cardenas - which houses a large recreation complex and the city's largest fish market - Parque Hidalgo to the Libramiento.
Col. Versalles - the old Zona Rosa, prior to the development of the North Hotel Zone.
Hotel Zone - Follows the coastline into down Vallarta  from the airport. Lined with hotels, timeshare resorts and residential towers.
Cols. Bugambillas and Ramblases - located on the NW slopes of the hills East of the city and relatively poor areas serviced mostly by dirt roads except for the hillside areas which have good views and thus attract residents with more resources.
Marina Vallarta - a large planned real estate tourism development near the airport with a marina, golf course, hotels, timeshare resorts and residential areas of homes and condominiums.
Del. Pitillal - once a small town and now a populous neighborhood, a separate delegación but now part of the City of Puerto Vallarta proper.
Col. Bobadilla - just north of Pitillal and also an important residential area.

The city also includes numerous fraccionamientos, densely built residential blocks that provide affordable housing for the city's workforce.

Additionally the municipality of Puerto Vallarta comprises a few other significant population centers (from South to North):
Boca de Tomatlán (pop. 570)
Mismaloya (pop. 970)
Las Juntas
Ixtapa (pop. 25,700) (n.b. there is a more well known Ixtapa in Guerrero - a resort development near the village of Zihuatanejo)
La Desembocada
El Ranchito (El Colesio)
El Colorado
Las Palmas de Arriba

 Sister cities 
 Highland Park, Illinois, United States
 Santa Barbara, California, United States

Notable people 
 Bob Widlar (19371991), American electronics engineer and a designer of linear integrated circuits (ICs) (Originally from Cleveland, Ohio, in U.S., lived until his death in Puerto Vallarta).
 Francisco Javier Bravo (born 1967), Mexican politician affiliated with the Institutional Revolutionary Party (born in Puerto Vallarta). 
 Aarón Díaz (born 1982), Mexican American actor, singer, and model (born in Puerto Vallarta, raised in Palo Alto, California, in U.S.).
 Ariadne Díaz (born 1985),  Mexican actress and former model (born in Puerto Vallarta). 
 Rodolfo Dickson (born 1997), Mexican Canadian alpine skier (Originally from Puerto Vallarta, based in Vancouver, British Columbia, Canada).
 Al and Barbara Garvey (Albert Garvey, born 1932, Chicago, Illinois/Barbara Sue Harman, born 1934, Champaign, Illinois), American artist and tango dancing couple (Originally from Illinois, U.S., currently based in Puerto Vallarta).
 Rafael González Reséndiz (born 1979), Mexican politician affiliated with the PRI (born in Puerto Vallarta). 
 Anjulí Ladrón de Guevara (born 1986), Mexican professional football Goalkeeper (born in Puerto Vallarta). 
 Manuel Lepe Macedo (19361984), Mexican artist and painter (Originally from Puerto Vallarta, lived until his death in Guadalajara, Jalisco).
 Gerardo López Villaseñor (born 1995), Mexican tennis player (born in Puerto Vallarta). 
 Natasha Moraga, American-born Mexican tile artist (Originally from La Mirada, California in U.S., currently based in Puerto Vallarta).
 Marco Antonio Nazareth (19862009), Mexican professional boxer (born and lived until his death in Puerto Vallarta).
 Alberto Ramírez (born 1986), Mexican footballer (born in Puerto Vallarta).
Francisca Rodriguez y Rodriguez - Puerto Vallarta's first teacher. She arrived in Puerto Vallarta in 1918 from Tomatlán, and served as Puerto Vallarta's schoolmistress until she retired in 1943. Initially she taught in improvised schools, but eventually moved to the 20 of November School on Calle Juárez (Juárez Street). She was affectionately remembered as La Pachita (the little Pasha) by generations of Vallartan schoolchildren. She was killed by an automobile in Calle Juárez not far from the school where she taught, and a bronze plaque at the site commemorates her life and death.  There is a street named after her in Colonia Emiliano Zapata. 
Carlos Munguía Fregoso (d. 2005) - well known as Puerto Vallarta's official historian and chronicler. He was author of countless articles on the history of Puerto Vallarta, and of several books, including most recently Panorama Histórico de Puerto Vallarta upon which much of the historical narrative in this article is based.

 See also 
 
 List of public art in Puerto Vallarta
 Lookout on Cross Hill
 Marieta Islands

 Notes 

References
Link to tables of population data from Census of 2005 INEGI: Instituto Nacional de Estadística, Geografía e Informática
Jalisco Enciclopedia de los Municipios de MéxicoMunguía Fregoso, Carlos - Panorama Histórico de Puerto Vallarta y de la Bahía de Banderas. Guadalajara (2003) Secretaría Cultura Jalisco
Montes de Oca de Contreras, Catalina - Puerto Vallarta en mis recuerdos. Guadalajara (1982) Gobierno de Jalisco, Secretaria General, Unidad Editorial
Guia Roji - Ciudad de Puerto Vallarta - Area Metropolitana Map 2005-6
Moon Handbooks - Puerto Vallarta Emeryville, California (2003) Avalon Travel Publishing
Martínez Campos, Gabriel - Recetario colimense de la iguana - Mexico DF (2004) Conaculta
Mantilla, Lucia - Los barrios pobres en 31 ciudades Mexicanas: Barrio Ramblases, Puerto Vallarta - Mexico (2004) Secretaria de Desarollo Social
Harris, Richard - Hidden Puerto Vallarta Berkeley (2006) Ulysses Press
 Children of the Dump Vallarta, Feed the Children Vallarta & the School of Champions Vallarta''

External links

 Puerto Vallarta official government site
Puerto Vallarta Tourism Official Website

 
Municipalities of Jalisco
Port cities and towns on the Mexican Pacific coast
Seaside resorts in Mexico
Beaches of Jalisco
Cities in Mexico